Sir George Frederick Duffey  (1843 - 1903) was president of the Royal College of Physicians of Ireland.

He received his medical degree from Trinity College in 1864, and entered the Army Medical Department in the same year.   He was stationed in Malta,  and wrote about instances of rheumatic orchitis which he observed there.

He was a founding member of the Dublin Biological Club.   He was an editor of the Irish Hospital Gazette, which he founded, and the Dublin Journal of Medical Science.

He was knighted in 1897.

Arms

References 

Knights Bachelor
Presidents of the Royal College of Physicians of Ireland
1843 births
1903 deaths